Syncopacma is a genus of moths in the family Gelechiidae.

Species

Syncopacma acanthyllidis (Walsingham, 1905)
Syncopacma adenocarpella (Rebel, 1927)
Syncopacma adversa (Braun, 1930)
Syncopacma albifrontella (Heinemann, 1870)
Syncopacma albipalpella (Herrich-Schäffer, 1854)
Syncopacma altaica Bidzilya, 2005
Syncopacma azosterella (Herrich-Schäffer, 1854)
Syncopacma biareatella (Erschoff, 1874)
Syncopacma buvati Nel, 1995
Syncopacma captivella (Herrich-Schäffer, 1854)
Syncopacma centralis Piskunov, 1979
Syncopacma cinctella (Clerck, 1759)
Syncopacma cincticulella (Bruand, 1851)
Syncopacma consimilis Janse, 1951
Syncopacma coronillella (Treitschke, 1833)
Syncopacma crotolariella (Busck, 1900)
Syncopacma dolini Bidzilya, 2005
Syncopacma euprosopa (Meyrick, 1926)
Syncopacma genistae (Walsingham, 1908)
Syncopacma incognitana Gozmány, 1957
Syncopacma karvoneni (Hackman, 1950)
Syncopacma larseniella Gozmány, 1957
Syncopacma leportensis 
Syncopacma linella (Chrétien, 1904)
Syncopacma lutea Janse, 1960
Syncopacma melanocephala Lvovsky & Piskunov, 1989
Syncopacma metadesma (Meyrick, 1927)
Syncopacma mitrella (Walsingham, 1905)
Syncopacma monochromella Janse, 1951
Syncopacma montanata Gozmány, 1957
Syncopacma nigrella (Chambers, 1875)
Syncopacma ochrofasciella (Toll, 1936)
Syncopacma oxyspila (Meyrick, 1909)
Syncopacma palpilineella (Chambers, 1875)
Syncopacma patruella (Mann, 1857)
Syncopacma perfuscata Janse, 1951
Syncopacma polychromella (Rebel, 1902)
Syncopacma sangiella (Stainton, 1863)
Syncopacma semicostella (Staudinger, 1871)
Syncopacma sikoraella Viette, 1956
Syncopacma steppicolella Junnilainen, 2010
Syncopacma suecicella (Wolff, 1958)
Syncopacma syncrita (Meyrick, 1926)
Syncopacma taeniolella (Zeller, 1839)
Syncopacma tadzhika Bidzilya, 2005
Syncopacma telaviviella (Amsel, 1933)
Syncopacma thaumalea (Walsingham, 1905)
Syncopacma ussuriella (Caradja, 1920)
Syncopacma vinella (Bankes, 1898)
Syncopacma wormiella (Wolff, 1958)
Syncopacma zonariella (Walsingham, 1905)

Status unclear
Syncopacma schillei (Strand, 1919), described as Anacampsis schillei from Galicia
Syncopacma serratella (Amsel, 1952), described as Schuetzeia serratella from Sardinia

References

 , 2007, Esperiana Buchreihe zur Entomologie Memoir 4: 91-116.
 , 2012: Syncopacma cottiennella n. sp. découverte dans les Hautes-Alpes (France). (Lepidoptera: Gelechiidae). Revue de l"Association Roussillonnaise d'Entomologie, 21 (3): 102–104.
 , 2010: The gelechiid fauna of the southern Ural Mountains, part I: descriptions of seventeen new species (Lepidoptera: Gelechiidae). Zootaxa 2366: 1-34. Abstract: http://www.mapress.com/zootaxa/2010/f/z02366p034f.pdf].

External links

 
Anacampsini
Taxa named by Edward Meyrick